(The School of the Jealous) is a dramma giocoso in two acts by Antonio Salieri, set to a libretto by Caterino Mazzolà.

Performance history

It was first performed at the Teatro San Moisè in Venice on 27 December 1778. In 1783 it was given at the Burgtheater in Vienna to inaugurate the reestablishment of the Italian opera troupe. Salieri revised the score for the 1783 performances, creating new arias and expanding the role of woodwinds and brass in the scoring of the work. The cast included Francesco Benucci as Blasio and Nancy Storace as the countess, the original Figaro and Susanna in Mozart's The Marriage of Figaro. It reached London in 1786, where, as in many other European cities, it enjoyed great success. Joseph Haydn composed two insertion arias for the work, one lost, the surviving aria, "Dice benissimo", for the bass role Lumaca and orchestra, H. 24b/5.

Among the many admirers of the opera was Johann Wolfgang von Goethe, who wrote to Charlotte von Stein in a letter dated 28 August 1784:

On 28 August 1784, Goethe was in Braunschweig. A production of the opera there in 1782 has been recorded.

The first modern revival was in concert in Leverkusen in 2015 (with recording). A production opened in Legnano, Italy (Salieri's birthplace) late in 2016 and subsequently toured to Jesi and Florence.  A further new production created by the Theater an der Wien opened at the Kammeropera, Vienna in May 2017 and transferred to Cologne in 2019. Bampton Classical Opera presented the UK modern première in 2017. In 2022 a production at the Teatro Regio in Turin used an edition with four arias added for the 1783 Vienna performances.

The North and South American première was given in 2017 in Montevideo by Ópera Joven ('Youth Opera') of Uruguay, in a co-production with Sodre, the public broadcasting organisation of Uruguay. A video of the production is available on YouTube.

Roles

Synopsis

The plot of the opera involves love intrigues, attempted seductions and provocations to jealousy between members of the three different social strata: the aristocracy, the bourgeoisie and the working class. The role of the Lieutenant is a close parallel to that of Don Alfonso in Mozart's Così fan tutte.

Recordings
 Salieri: La scuola de' gelosi, Emiliano d'Aguanno, Francesca Lombardi Mazzulli, Federico Sacchi, Roberta Mameli, Florian Gotz, Milena Storti, Patrick Vogel; L`arte del mondo,  DHM 2016

Notes

References

Further reading

 Rice, John A.: "La scuola de' gelosi", Grove Music Online ed L. Macy (accessed 4 May 2007), grovemusic.com, subscription access.
 Rice, John A.: "La scuola de' gelosi" in The New Grove Dictionary of Opera, ed. Stanley Sadie (London, 1992) 

Drammi giocosi
Operas by Antonio Salieri
1778 operas
Italian-language operas
Operas